PJSC Svetlana is a company based in Saint Petersburg, Russia. It is primarily involved in the research, design, and manufacturing of electronic and microelectronic instruments. Svetlana is part of Ruselectronics. The name of the company is said to originate from the words for 'light of an incandescent lamp' (СВЕТ ЛАмпы НАкаливания).

History
The company was established in 1889 as the Ya. M. Aivaz Factory. Svetlana was a major producer of vacuum tubes. In 1937, the Soviet Union purchased a tube assembly line from RCA, including production licenses and initial staff training, and installed it on the St Petersburg plant. US-licensed tubes were produced since then.

Since 2001, New Sensor Corp. has been holding the rights for the Svetlana vacuum tube brand for the US and Canada. The New Sensor tubes are actually manufactured at the Expo-pul factory (former Reflektor plant) in Saratov. Tubes manufactured by Svetlana in Saint Petersburg still bear the "winged С" (cyrillic S) logo (see the image below) but no longer the name Svetlana.

In 2017 the company announced a 3 billion ruble modernization plan.

Products
The Svetlana Association produces a variety of electronic and microelectronic instruments, including transmitting and modulator tubes for all frequency ranges; X-band broadband passive TR limiter; KU-band broadband TR tube; klystron amplifiers; X-ray tubes; portable X-ray units for medicine and industry; high-frequency fast response thyristors; transistors; integrated microcircuits; microcomputers; microcontrollers; microcalculators; ultrasonic delay lines; receiving tubes; process equipment for the manufacture of electronic engineering items. Vacuum tubes currently in production include the 6550, 6L6, EL34, and KT88.

See also
 6P1P vacuum tube
 Russian tube designations
 7400 series – Second sources in Europe and the Eastern Bloc
 Soviet integrated circuit designation

References

External links
 Official website

Electronics companies of Russia
Manufacturing companies of Russia
Companies based in Saint Petersburg
Ruselectronics
Vacuum tubes
Manufacturing companies established in 1889
Electronics companies of the Soviet Union
Companies nationalised by the Soviet Union
Ministry of the Electronics Industry (Soviet Union)
Russian brands